Khatazhukay is a rural locality (an aul) in Khatazhukayskoye Rural Settlement of Shovgenovsky District, the Republic of Adygea, Russia. The population was 907 as of 2018. There are 24 streets.

Geography 
Khatazhukay is on the right bank of the Fars River, near the village of Pshicho, 8 km north of Khakurinokhabl (the district's administrative centre) by road. Pshicho is the nearest rural locality.

Ethnicity 
The aul is inhabited by Circassians.

References 

Rural localities in Shovgenovsky District